As a nickname, Hawk or The Hawk may refer to:

In arts and entertainment 

 Coleman Hawkins (1904–1969), American jazz saxophonist
 Ronnie Hawkins (born 1935), American rockabilly musician also known as "The Hawk"
 Hawk Koch (born 1945), American film producer and former road manager for The Supremes and The Dave Clark Five
 Hawk Wolinski (born 1948), American keyboardist, songwriter and record producer

In sports 
 Ralph "Hawk" Branca (1926–2016), American All Star baseball player
 Andre Dawson (born 1954), American Hall of Fame baseball player nicknamed "The Hawk"
 Barry Hawkins (born 1979), English professional snooker player nicknamed "The Hawk"
 Connie Hawkins (1942–2017), former National Basketball Association player and Harlem Globetrotter known as "The Hawk"
 Ben Hogan (1912–1997), American golfer nicknamed "The Hawk"
 Harry "Hawk" McGinnis (born 1926), American making an around-the-world walking tour
 Ken Harrelson (born 1941), American All Star baseball player and sportscaster nicknamed "The Hawk"
 Hawk Taylor (1939–2012), American Major League Baseball catcher nicknamed "The Hawk"

See also 

Lists of people by nickname